Hujayrah  is a Syrian village located in Markaz Rif Dimashq District, Rif Dimashq. According to the Syria Central Bureau of Statistics (CBS), Hujayrah had a population of 4,584 in the 2004 census. It is located in the Babbila subdistrict. Its population is composed of Sunni Arabs. To its north are Hajar al-Aswad, to its east is Al-Buwaydah, to its south is Hawsh Sahiya and to its west is Sbeineh.

References 

Populated places in Markaz Rif Dimashq District